Scopula limboundata, the large lace-border, is a moth of the family Geometridae. It was described by Adrian Hardy Haworth in 1809. It is found in North America east of the Rocky Mountains. There is a single and unconfirmed record from Great Britain.

Adults are on wing from late May to late August or early September.

The larvae feed on apple, blueberry, clover, dandelion, meadow-beauty, and black cherry.

References

External links

"Lace-border Moth". Moths of Fermilab. Archived from the original July 21, 2011.
"Large Lace Border Moth Scopula limboundata #7159". PBase.

limboundata
Moths of North America
Moths described in 1809
Taxa named by Adrian Hardy Haworth